Antoni Marian Łomnicki (17 January 1881 – 4 July 1941) was a Polish mathematician.

Antoni Łomnicki was educated at Jan Kazimierz University in Lwów in Poland and the University of Göttingen in Germany. In 1920 he became professor of the Lwów University of Technology. In 1938 he became a member of the Warsaw Scientific Society (TNW).

Łomnicki was murdered by the Nazi Germans during the Second World War on the Wzgórza Wuleckie in Lwów in the Massacre of Lwów professors.

In December 1944 Stefan Banach wrote the following tribute to Łomnicki:
A native of Lwów, he worked for over twenty years as a mathematics professor at the Lwów University of Technology. He prepared hundreds of engineers for their profession. I was his assistant. He was the first to instil in me the importance and responsibility of a professor’s task. He was an unrivalled educator, one of the best I ever knew. He was the author of many popular schoolbooks as well as textbooks on advanced analysis for technologists, surpassing in quality those published abroad. His work in the field of cartography was at a high level. Equally effective were his teaching and pedagogic efforts. Professor Łomnicki had tremendous energy and a great work ethic.

See also
 Massacre of Lwów professors
 Lwów School of Mathematics

References
 Emilia Jakimowicz and Adam Miranowicz (2011) Stefan Banach: Remarkable Life, Brilliant Mathematics, 3rd edition, page 25, Gdańsk University Press,  .

1881 births
1941 deaths
Lwów School of Mathematics
Victims of the Massacre of Lwów professors
Academic staff of Lviv Polytechnic